Perssonska gården is a listed building in Hedemora, Dalarna County, Sweden. It was built 1849, after the second city fire, under the direction of Axel Reinhold Hulting. The name originates from Isidor Persson, who ran a hardware store in the building in the early 20th century.

References 
Arne Moström, Harriet Alander (2004). Kulturpromenad Hedemora – Dalarnas äldsta stad. Hedemora kommun
Olsson, Daniels Sven (1980). Bebyggelse i Hedemora stad: kulturhistorisk miljöanalys. Dalarnas museums serie av rapporter, 0348-2863 ; 11. Falun: Dalarnas museum

Listed buildings in Hedemora Municipality